Mark Pasman (March 16, 1932 in Riga, Latvia – August 4, 2011) was a Latvian chess player who won the Latvian Chess Championship in 1951.

Chess career
Pasman learned to play chess at the age of 14 and in 1951 he won the Latvian Chess Championship. Other results in the Latvian Chess Championship:  1949 – 14th, 1950 – 4th, 1952 – 2nd, 1953 – 5th, 1954 – 5th, 1961 – 9th.
In 1958 he won the Riga Chess Championship and he won the Soviet "Dinamo" championship in 1964.

Pasman played for Latvia in the Soviet Team chess championships in 1953 (+0 −2 =5), 1958 (+2 −4 =2), and 1960 (5 out of 7). He also played in the Soviet Team chess cup for teams "Daugava" in 1954 (+3 −5 =2) and "Dinamo" in 1968 (+1 −5 =3).
He was a graduate of the University of Latvia.

References

 Žuravļevs, N.; Dulbergs, I.; Kuzmičovs, G. (1980), Latvijas šahistu jaunrade, Rīga, Avots., pp. 71 – 72 (in Latvian).

External links
 
 

1932 births
2011 deaths
Latvian chess players
Soviet chess players
University of Latvia alumni
Sportspeople from Riga